Aleksandr Aleksandrovich Kerbs (born 12 September 1993) is a Russian football player. He plays for FC Irtysh Omsk.

Club career
He made his debut in the Russian Football National League for FC Irtysh Omsk on 12 August 2020 in a game against FC Chertanovo Moscow.

References

External links
 
 Profile by Russian Football National League
 

1993 births
Sportspeople from Omsk
Russian people of German descent
Living people
Russian footballers
Association football defenders
FC Irtysh Omsk players
Russian First League players
Russian Second League players